Azat Karachurin is a Russian Paralympic biathlete who won gold medal for the 12.5 km standing event despite missing one target on March 11, 2014, at the 2014 Winter Paralympics in Sochi, Russia. After the event, he received congratulations from the Russian President Vladimir Putin who said that his hard work earned him a  medal. He was also a winner of bronze medal for the 7.5 km biathlon race in the same place.

References

Living people
20th-century births
Paralympic bronze medalists for Russia
Paralympic gold medalists for Russia
Biathletes at the 2014 Winter Paralympics
Year of birth missing (living people)
Russian male biathletes
Paralympic medalists in biathlon
Medalists at the 2014 Winter Paralympics
Paralympic biathletes of Russia